Mycetochara is a genus of comb-clawed beetles in the family Tenebrionidae. There are at least 30 described species in Mycetochara.

Species
These 32 species belong to the genus Mycetochara:

 Mycetochara analis (LeConte, 1878) g
 Mycetochara axillaris (Paykull, 1799) g
 Mycetochara bicolor (Couper, 1865) g b
 Mycetochara binotata (Say, 1824) g b
 Mycetochara brenskei Seidlitz, 1896 g
 Mycetochara excelsa Reitter, 1884 g
 Mycetochara flavicornis (Miller, 1883) g
 Mycetochara flavipennis Reitter, 1908 g
 Mycetochara flavipes (Fabricius, 1793) g
 Mycetochara foveata (LeConte, 1866) g b
 Mycetochara fraterna (Say, 1824) g b
 Mycetochara graciliformis Reitter, 1899 g
 Mycetochara gracilis (Faldermann, 1837) g
 Mycetochara haldemani LeConte, 1866 b
 Mycetochara humeralis (Fabricius, 1787) g
 Mycetochara jonica (Obenberger, 1916) g
 Mycetochara linearis (Illiger, 1794) g
 Mycetochara maura (Fabricius, 1792) g
 Mycetochara myrmecophila (Obenberger, 1916) g
 Mycetochara netolitzkyi (Penecke, 1912) g
 Mycetochara obscura (Zetterstedt, 1838) g
 Mycetochara ocularis Reitter, 1884 g
 Mycetochara procera Casey, 1891 g
 Mycetochara pygmaea (Redtenbacher, 1874) g
 Mycetochara quadrimaculata (Latreille, 1804) g
 Mycetochara retowskyi (Reitter, 1889) g
 Mycetochara roubali Maran, 1935 g
 Mycetochara rudis (Kuster, 1850) g
 Mycetochara ruficollis Baudi, 1877 g
 Mycetochara scutellaris (Baudi, 1877) g
 Mycetochara sulcipennis Reitter, 1896 g
 Mycetochara thoracica (Gredler, 1854) g

Data sources: i = ITIS, c = Catalogue of Life, g = GBIF, b = Bugguide.net

References

Further reading

External links

 

Alleculinae